Gemma Elizabeth Whelan (born 23 April 1981) is an English actress and comedian known for portraying Yara Greyjoy in the HBO fantasy-drama series Game of Thrones. She also plays Kate in all seasons of the comedy Upstart Crow, Detective Eunice Noon on the first season of The End of the F***ing World on Channel 4, and Geraldine on the third season of Killing Eve.

Early life
Whelan was born in Leeds and grew up in the Midlands. She attended The King's High School for Girls in Warwick and the London Studio Centre.

Career

As a stand-up comedian, Whelan won the 2010 Funny Women Variety Award. 
She performed at the 2013 Edinburgh Fringe with her show Chastity Butterworth & The Spanish Hamster.
In 2014 she recorded a pilot chat show as her character Chastity Butterworth for BBC Radio 4.

On screen, she has played supporting roles in several films and TV shows, including in the 2010 films Gulliver's Travels and The Wolfman. She played Kate (appearing in all 18 main episodes, as well as three Christmas specials) in Ben Elton's BBC Two comedy Upstart Crow and was a series regular on The End of the F***ing World. She also played roles in other comedies, including Uncle and The Agency.

In August 2011, she was cast as Yara Greyjoy in the HBO fantasy-drama television series Game of Thrones and appeared as a recurring cast member from the second season onward. In 2017, she portrayed Karen Matthews in the two-part TV drama The Moorside, based on the 2008 disappearance of nine-year-old Shannon Matthews. In 2019, she appeared as Marian Lister in the BBC drama Gentleman Jack.

In February 2020, a stage adaptation of Upstart Crow opened at the Gielgud Theatre, London, Whelan reprising the role of Kate. Whelan returned to the West End stage as Kate when the play was revived at the Apollo Theatre in 2022.

Personal life
Whelan lives in London with her husband, the comedian and actor Gerry Howell and their two children.

Filmography

Film

Television

Stage

Video games

Short films

Awards and nominations

References

External links

Amore, video with Whelan on Upstart Crow

Living people
English film actresses
English stand-up comedians
English women comedians
Actresses from Leeds
21st-century English actresses
English stage actresses
English television actresses
English video game actresses
English voice actresses
1981 births
WFTV Award winners
People educated at The King's High School for Girls